Esmaeil Dousti is an Iranian reformist politician who currently serves as a member of the City Council of Tehran. Dousti is a former MP and governor.

References

1958 births
Living people
Tehran Councillors 2013–2017
National Trust Party (Iran) politicians
People from Kuhdasht
Governors of Kohgiluyeh and Boyer-Ahmad Province
Members of the 5th Islamic Consultative Assembly
Mayors of districts in Tehran
Islamic Revolutionary Guard Corps officers